Yousef Alikhani (born 1975) is an Iranian writer.

Early life
Alikhani was born in the Tati-speaking village of Milak, Qazvīn Province. He studied Arabic literature at the University of Tehran.

Career
Alikhani released his third collection of short stories in April 2010.

Works

Books
  
 Biveh-koshi • Widow Killing, Aamout Publication, 2015. .
 قصه های مردم الموت (Persian Edition) 
  
 Aroos-e’-Beed (Willow’s Bride), Aamout Publication, 2009. .
 Dragon Slayage, Aamout Publication, 2007. .
 اژدهاکشان, 2009
 
 سه گانه یوسف علیخانی (Persian Edition)
 Ghadam Bekheir was my Grandmother, Aamout Publication, 2003. .
 زاهو (Persian Edition), 2022.

Other books
 
 Looking for Hassan Sabbah: the Life story of the god of Alamut for Young Adults, Qoqnoos Publication, 2007. .
 Saeb Tabrizi’s Life, Madraseh Publication, 2007. .
 Ibn Batuteh’s Life, Madraseh Publication, 2004. .
 Aziz and Negar: Re-reading a love story, Qoqnoos Publication, 2002
 The Third Generation of Fiction Writing in Today’s Iran: Interviews with Writers, Markaz Publication, 2001

Awards 

Nominated in the Annual Zarrin-ghalam Awards (for “Biveh-koshi” ~ Widow Killing)

Nominated in the  Mehregan-e-Adab Awards (for “Aroose Beed” ~ Willow's Bride)

Winner of the 10th Habib Ghanipour Annual Book Prize (for “Aroose Beed”)

Nominated in the 12th Ketab-e-Fasl Awards (for “Aroose Beed”)

Appraised in the 1st Jalal Al-Ahmad Literature Awards & Nominated in the 8th Hushang Golshiri Prize (for “Ezhdehakoshan” ~ Dragon Slaying)

Nominated in the  21st Islamic Republic of Iran Annual Book Awards & Winner of the 16th Roosta Festival Special Prize (for “Ghadam Bekheyr”)

Winner of Best Film in the 7th Young Cinema Regional Awards (for “Aziz & Negar _ A Documantary”)

References

External links 
 Aamout Publication 
 Author Biography: Yousef Alikhani
 His blog 
 Another of his blogs 
 Alikhani on Ghabil.com 
 Interview in Aftab newspaper 
 Yousef Alikhani, Google Scholar
 Books by Yousef Alikhani on Amazon
 Yousef Alikhani profile at orcid.org

Iranian writers
Iranian male short story writers
1975 births
Living people
People from Alamut